Mount Morris, New York refers to:

Mount Morris (village), New York 
Mount Morris (town), New York
Marcus Garvey Park, also called Mount Morris Park, in Harlem, New York
Mount Morris Park Historic District, the area surrounding Marcus Garvey Park
Mount Morris (New York), a mountain in New York’s Adirondack Park